R.E. Dietz Company was a lighting products manufacturer. They are best known for hot blast and cold blast kerosene lanterns. The company started in 1840 when its founder, 22-year-old Robert Edwin Dietz purchased a lamp and oil business in Brooklyn, New York. Though famous for well built indoor and outdoor kerosene lanterns, the company was a major player in the automotive lighting industry from the 1920s through into the 1960s.

Dietz also produced the majority of road work warning lights. First oil lanterns (Traffic-Gard trademark) and road torches which looked like cannonballs with large wicks. Kerosene was normally used in these lamps. Later they developed some of the first transistorized warning lights (Visi-Flash trademark) using standard 6volt lantern batteries. These lights either blinked in timed intervals or had a steady light.

In popular culture
The 1992 made-for-cable television film The Water Engine stars William H. Macy as an employee of Dietz Company who invents an engine that runs on distilled water. Unscrupulous lawyers attempt to take possession of the invention based on the claim that it is built from parts and tools owned by Dietz.

See also
Lantern
Visi-Flash

External links and sources
Dietz Traffic-Gard history
R.E. Dietz company timeline

Lighting brands
Manufacturing companies established in 1840